The Folkerts SK-2, also known as Speed King Two, "Toots" and "Miss Detroit"  was a racer built for the 1936 National Air Races

Design and development
Clayton Folkerts designed his second racer, the SK-2 Toots after leaving the Mono-Aircraft Company, and Waco. It was commissioned by TWA pilot Harold Neumann in 1936.

The aircraft was a mid-winged conventional geared aircraft with crank activated retractable landing gear and trailing edge flaps. The fuselage was built of welded steel tube with aircraft fabric covering and the wings were made with spruce spars and plywood covering. The Menasco C-4S engine featured a one-foot propeller extension to allow a more streamlined cowling.

Operational history
In the 1936 National Air Races, Harold Neumann won three firsts, two seconds, and placed fourth in the Thompson Trophy race. Steve Wittman survived a flight in the SK-2 with a ruptured gas tank that leaked into the cockpit. In St. Louis, pilot Roger Don Rae landed gear up, badly damaging the aircraft.

At the 1937 National Air Races, the aircraft was renamed "Miss Detroit" and pilot Roger Don Rae placed three seconds and one fourth place.

In the 1938 Oakland Air Races, the rear fuselage was metalized. Pilot Gus Gotch was chosen as pilot; he entered a spin on a pylon turn and was killed when the aircraft struck the bay. The cause was undetermined, but fellow racing pilots blamed the heavy locking mechanism for the landing gear as a contributing distraction in high-speed low level flight.

Variants
The Folkerts SK-3 has a nearly identical design, except for a longer nose for a Menasco C-6S-4 engine.

Specifications (Folkerts SK-1)

See also

References
Notes

Bibliography

 Foxworth, Thomas G. The Speed Seekers. New York: New York: Doubleday, 1976. .
 Matthews, Birch. Race with the Wind: How Air Racing Advanced Aviation. Minneapolis, Minnesota: Zenith Publishing, 2001. .
 Matowitz, Thomas G. Jr. Cleveland's National Air Races (Images of Aviation). Mount Pleasant, South Carolina: Arcadia Publishing, 2006. .
 Schmid, Sylvester H. and Truman C. Weaver. The Golden Age of Air Racing: 1927–1933. Oshkosh, Wisconsin: EAA Aviation Foundation, 1983. .
 Vorderman, Don. The Great Air Races. New York: Doubleday, 1969.

External links

Photo of the SK-2

Racing aircraft
Mid-wing aircraft
Single-engined tractor aircraft
Aircraft first flown in 1936